Project H.A.M.M.E.R., listed internally as "Hammer Man", was a beat 'em up video game in development by Nintendo Software Technology for the Wii. The team's other projects included Metroid Prime Hunters, 1080° Avalanche, and Wave Race: Blue Storm. Project H.A.M.M.E.R. was originally announced at E3 2006. No information regarding the game has been released to the public or media since the game's original announcement. Rumors began circulating in mid-June 2007 that the game was not going to be released, and that the development team had gone to work on other games. Nintendo confirmed at E3 2007 that development was on hold. Beth Llewelyn, senior director of public relations at Nintendo of America, made a point to note that despite the game not being a focus of Nintendo’s, Project H.A.M.M.E.R. "may come back" in the future. A report revealed that the game was cancelled in 2009 due to creative internal conflicts at Nintendo Software Technology.

History 

Nintendo Software Technology, a team at Nintendo, began development on Project H.A.M.M.E.R. in 2003 for the Wii video game console. The project's internal codename was "Machinex" and it was designed for Nintendo's Western and hardcore gamer market. Unlike classic Nintendo games, the title was brutal and gritty. The game was officially announced at the 2006 Electronic Entertainment Expo. Silver Ant, another studio, produced the game's computer animated cutscenes. The project was revised several times even though it had almost reached completion. In one incarnation, the project became "Wii Crush" with cuter graphics but similar gameplay. A postmortem from former developers explained that the game's Wii Remote motion were never sufficiently enjoyable. The developers blamed the game's failure on the culture and racism of Nintendo Software Technology's senior Japanese leads, who the developers reported as ignoring their input on the cultural interests of the game's Western market.

Developers began leaving the team around when the game became the cuter "Wii Crush". The developers reported that the senior staff fired Project H.A.M.M.E.R. lead designer and did not take personal ownership of the project's faults. Nintendo of America conducted an internal review that showed the company's lowest morale scores. The project was finally cancelled in 2009.

In July 2021, more information about the 2020 Nintendo Gigaleak revealed its title internally as "Hammer Man" and spoke about its beat 'em up style resembling musou gameplay.

References

 http://www.avclub.com/article/report-claims-reveal-sad-fate-nintendos-unreleased-221816
 https://www.engadget.com/2015/07/05/untold-story-of-nintendo-project-hammer/

External links
IGN Wii page

Action video games
Hack and slash games
Nintendo games
Nintendo Software Technology games
Cancelled Wii games
Science fiction video games

fi:Nintendo Software Technology Corporation#Videopelit